The 1911–12 Scottish Division Two was won by Ayr United, with Albion Rovers and Vale of Leven finishing bottom.

Table

References 

 Scottish Football Archive

Scottish Division Two seasons
2